Walter Spanghero (born 21 December 1943) is a former French rugby union footballer. His father, Ferruccio Dante Spanghero, emigrated from Friuli, arriving in France in the 1930s to make a living as a bricklayer. He was a part of the France national team which won the 1968 Grand Slam in the Five Nations. He was also a part of the French side which won the Five Nations in 1967 and 1973. He played for France over 50 times. He played at number 8, lock and flanker. He famously had a very stormy relationship with his brother, Claude,  who was also an international rugby player for France.

Former All Black Colin Meads, considered the greatest New Zealand rugby player in history, nominated Spanghero as his toughest international opponent.

References

External links
 Walter Spanghero on scrum.com
  Walter Spanghero on FFR.fr

1943 births
French rugby union players
Living people
Rugby union flankers
Rugby union locks
Rugby union number eights
French people of Italian descent
People of Friulian descent
France international rugby union players